I Love It is the second studio album released by American country music singer Craig Morgan. The album contains four singles: "God, Family And Country", "Almost Home", "Every Friday Afternoon", and "Look at Us", all of which entered the Hot Country Songs charts between 2002 and 2004. "Almost Home" was the highest peaking single of these four, reaching a peak of number 6 on the country charts.

The first single, "God, Family, and Country", was also recorded by the group 4 Runner on their 2003 album Getaway Car. 4 Runner also provide backing vocals on Morgan's rendition. "God, Family, and Country" is also dedicated to songwriter and musician Randy Hardison, who played drums on it.

Track listing

Personnel
As listed in liner notes.

Tracks 1-10
Larry Beaird – acoustic guitar, banjo, mandolin
Mike Brignardello – bass guitar
Glen Duncan – fiddle
Rob Hajacos – fiddle
Mike Johnson – steel guitar, Dobro
Jeff King – electric guitar
Paul Leim – drums
Chris McHugh – drums
Craig Morgan – lead vocals, background vocals
Jimmy Nichols – piano, keyboards, Hammond organ
Phil O'Donnell – acoustic guitar, harmonica
Russell Terrell – background vocals

Track 11
Randy Hardison – drums
Larry Paxton – bass guitar
Jonathan Yudkin – strings
4 Runner:
Jim Chapman – bass vocals
Lee Hilliard – tenor vocals
Craig Morris – baritone vocals, piano
Michael Lusk – baritone vocals

Chart performance

Weekly charts

Year-end charts

Singles

References

2003 albums
BBR Music Group albums
Craig Morgan albums